Daniel Michael O'Shaughnessy (born 14 September 1994) is a Finnish professional footballer who plays for Karlsruher SC and the Finland national team as a defender. He began his career in the youth systems at Honka, HJK and Metz and also played in England for Braintree Town and Cheltenham Town. After rising to prominence and winning three times Veikkausliiga during his second spell with HJK, O'Shaughnessy transferred to German club Karlsruher SC in 2022.

Early life 
O'Shaughnessy was born in Riihimäki on 14 September 1994, the son of a Finnish mother and an Irish father (Robert, a painter from Galway). He holds dual Finnish-Irish citizenship. His older brother Patrick is a former professional footballer.

Club career

Youth years 
A central defender, O'Shaughnessy began his career in Finland alongside his brother Patrick at Honka and was part of the youth team which made an impressive showing at the 2008 Nike Premier Cup. Both brothers joined Veikkausliiga club HJK in early 2009. O'Shaughnessy broke into the club's reserve team the following year, making 23 appearances and scoring two goals during the 2011 Kakkonen season, missing out on promotion to the Ykkönen after a playoff semi-final defeat to BK-46.

After trials at Premier League clubs Liverpool, Manchester United, Sunderland and Scottish Premier League club Celtic, O'Shaughnessy moved to French Ligue 2 club Metz on a -year contract in early January 2012. He made 40 appearances and scored one goal for the club's reserve team and helped the team to the 2013–14 Championnat de France amateur 2 Group C title. O'Shaughnessy departed Metz at the end of the 2013–14 season, having failed to receive a call into the first team squad.

Brentford 
joined newly-promoted Championship club Brentford on trial in July 2014 and made a 30-minute cameo in a 4–0 pre-season friendly defeat to Osasuna on 29 July. On 1 August, it was announced that O'Shaughnessy had signed a two-year professional contract. He was an unused substitute during Brentford's two League Cup ties in August 2014, but instead spent the 2014–15 season in the Development Squad, for which he made 23 appearances and scored one goal.

O'Shaughnessy began the 2015–16 season in the Development Squad and joined National League club Braintree Town on a one-month loan on 22 September 2015. His only appearance for the club came later that day as a half time substitute for Sam Habergham during a 2–1 win over Woking. Following another spell back with the Brentford Development Squad, O'Shaughnessy joined Danish Superliga club Midtjylland on loan until the end of the 2015–16 season in late January 2016. He made one appearance, when he replaced replaced Kian Hansen after 59 minutes of a 4–1 victory over Nordsjælland on the final day of the season. O'Shaughnessy was released by Brentford in May 2016, after failing to make a first team appearance during his two seasons at Griffin Park.

Cheltenham Town 
On 12 July 2016, O'Shaughnessy signed a one-year contract with League Two newcomers Cheltenham Town. During a 2016–17 season in which the Robins narrowly avoided being relegated straight back into non-League football, he made 36 appearances and scored four goals. O'Shaughnessy signed a new one-year contract in June 2017, but he was down the defensive pecking order during the first half of the 2017–18 season and he departed the club on 2 January 2018. O'Shaughnessy made 49 appearances and scored four goals during 18 months at Whaddon Road.

Return to HJK 
On 2 January 2018, O'Shaughnessy returned to Finland to re-join reigning Veikkausliiga champions HJK on a two-year contract, with the option of a further year. Despite missing the final three months of the 2018 season with a knee injury, O'Shaughnessy made 24 appearances, scored three goals and in his absence, HJK were crowned Veikkausliiga champions. O'Shaughnessy was a near ever-present during the 2019 season and finished the campaign with 31 appearances and three goals.

During a period while he was conducting his national service, O'Shaughnessy signed a new two-year contract in October 2019 and made 28 appearances during HJK's double-winning 2020 season. O'Shaughnessy made 35 appearances and scored one goal during the 2021 season, in which he captained the team to the Veikkausliiga championship. 2021 was O'Shaughnessy's final season at the Bolt Arena and he ended his career with the club on 118 appearances and 9 goals. In each of his final two seasons with the club, O'Shaughnessy was voted the Veikkausliiga Defender of the Year and into the Veikkausliiga Team of the Year.

Karlsruher SC 
On 30 August 2021, it was announced that O'Shaughnessy would join 2. Bundesliga club Karlsruher SC on 1 December 2021, on a contract running until June 2023. He made his debut on 15 January 2022 playing full 90 minutes in a match against Darmstadt. He finished a mid-table 2021–22 season with 15 appearances and one goal, before suffering a fractured fibula on international duty in June 2022. He returned to fitness in mid-November 2022.

International career 
O'Shaughnessy represented Finland at all age-groups from U15 up to U21 level. He won his maiden call into the senior team for a friendly versus Estonia on 9 June 2015, but remained an unused substitute during the 2–0 defeat. O'Shaughnessy made his full international debut as a late substitute for Ville Jalasto in a 3–0 friendly defeat to Sweden in Abu Dhabi on 10 January 2016. He made his first start three days later versus Iceland and played the full 90 minutes of a 1–0 defeat.

Two years after his maiden call-up to the senior team, O'Shaughnessy won his third cap as a half time substitute in a 2–1 friendly win over Jordan on 11 January 2018. He won his first competitive cap with a start in a 1–0 2020–21 UEFA Nations League B defeat to Wales on 3 September 2020. O'Shaughnessy was named in the Finland squad for Euro 2020 and was the only domestic-based player in the selection. He started in each of the Finns' three group stage matches, prior to the team's elimination. He scored his first goal for Finland in a 3–1 2022 World Cup qualifying win over Bosnia and Herzegovina on 13 November 2021.

Career statistics

Club

International 

Scores and results list Finland's goal tally first, score column indicates score after each O'Shaughnessy goal.

Honours

Klubi 04
 Kakkonen Group A: 2011

Metz B
Championnat de France Amateur 2 Group C: 2013–14

HJK
 Veikkausliiga: 2018, 2020, 2021
 Finnish Cup: 2020
Individual
Veikkausliiga Defender of the Year: 2020, 2021
Veikkausliiga Team of the Year: 2020, 2021

References

External links 

Karlsruher SC official profile
Daniel O'Shaughnessy – SPL competition record

 

1994 births
Living people
People from Riihimäki
Association football central defenders
Association football fullbacks
Finnish footballers
Finland youth international footballers
Finland under-21 international footballers
Finland international footballers
Finnish people of Irish descent
FC Honka players
Klubi 04 players
FC Metz players
Brentford F.C. players
Braintree Town F.C. players
FC Midtjylland players
Cheltenham Town F.C. players
Helsingin Jalkapalloklubi players
Veikkausliiga players
Kakkonen players
Championnat National 2 players
Championnat National 3 players
English Football League players
National League (English football) players
Danish Superliga players
UEFA Euro 2020 players
Finnish expatriate footballers
Finnish expatriate sportspeople in France
Expatriate footballers in France
Finnish expatriate sportspeople in England
Expatriate footballers in England
Finnish expatriate sportspeople in Denmark
Expatriate men's footballers in Denmark
Karlsruher SC players
Finnish expatriate sportspeople in Germany
Expatriate footballers in Germany
2. Bundesliga players
Sportspeople from Kanta-Häme